Shelkey Maruti Rao (25 April 1921–2000) was an Indian cinematographer who worked mainly in Tamil films.

Career

Cinematography 
Rao was born in Thanjavur on 25 April 1921. He became interested in photography as a student. He carried his camera to school regularly. Impressed by his interest in photography, his neighbour, N. C. Pillai, the-then editor of Flash magazine, asked if he would be interested in joining cinema. With permission from his parents, Rao enlisted as an apprentice in Pragajothi Films in 1940 for Choodamani, a Telugu film. The film's main cinematographer was Mama Shinde.

Rao's next film was the Tamil film Kalamegam, directed by Ellis R. Dungan. He worked as assistant under Marcus Bartley. He later moved to Vel Pictures in Guindy and worked on the film Bhakthi Mala. The cinematographer was impressed with Rao's work, such that he took him on as first assistant and gave him the responsibility of handling the Mitchell camera.

After World War II, Rao joined Pragathi Studio and was the still photographer for Sri Valli, produced by A. V. Meiyappan. When Meiyappan moved to Karaikudi, Rao got to work as still photographer and first photographer for R. N. Nagendra Rao's Mahathma Kabir. When the film's German photographer left, Rao finished the film.

When Meiyappan returned from Karaikudi, Rao worked as second photographer and as manager of the still department. During the making of P. Neelakandan's Or Iravu, Rao worked for the first time as the main cinematographer and his cinematography received widespread acclaim. He went on to work in as many as 60 films: 34 in Tamil, 13 in Hindi, eight in Kannada and five in Telugu. He was the make-up test photographer for actors like Sivaji Ganesan, S. V. Subbiah, Vyjayanthimala and Hema Malini before they entered cinema.

Other work 
Besides cinematography, Rao produced several television serials and documentaries. He also served as an honorary member of Tamil Nadu Public Service Commission, and the Selection Committee Chairman for the Film and Television Institute of India.

Select filmography 
Or Iravu (1951)
Parasakthi (1952)
Andha Naal (1954)
Server Sundaram (1964)
Anbe Vaa (1966)

References

External links 
 

Cinematographers from Tamil Nadu
1921 births
Tamil film cinematographers
People from Thanjavur
2000 deaths